The 2015 Derbyshire Dales District Council election was held on 7 May 2015 to elect all 39 members of Derbyshire Dales District Council. This was on the same day as other local elections.

The Conservative Party retained control of the council for the fourth consecutive election, with a majority of 19.

Election result

Ward Results Summary

Ward Results

By-elections between 2015 and 2019

References

2015 English local elections
May 2015 events in the United Kingdom
2015
2010s in Derbyshire